Jordan Walker-Pearlman (born June 24, 1967) is an American film director, screenwriter, film producer, and executive.

Early life
Walker-Pearlman was born in New York City, and is the nephew of actor Gene Wilder with whom he lived part of the time since childhood.

Career
Jordan is best known for the 2000 film The Visit, for which he was nominated for two Independent Spirit Awards (One for Directing and one for Writing the Screenplay) and the movie four.

His 2005 film, Constellation, starring Gabrielle Union, Zoe Saldana, and Billy Dee Williams, premiered at the Pan African Film Festival, Roxbury Film Festival, Black Filmmmaker Magazine Film Festival, and the Chicago International Film Festival. It also had a special premiere at the Kwa Mashu Film Festival in South Africa with both director and actress Gabrielle Union present for ten days to open the movie theater at the Arts Centre in the Kwa Mashu Township.

Both films won the Audience Award at the Urbanworld Film Festival in their respective years.

Personal life
In 2015, Jordan married screenwriter Elizabeth Hunter.

On February 3, 2020, he wrote an op-ed for The Los Angeles Times calling on the Motion Picture Academy to recognize the “cultural violence” of historical racism in American movies in its new Academy Museum of Motion Pictures in Los Angeles and explained his years earlier decision to decline an invitation to membership in the organization. The op-ed was the first of several that year that appeared to influence AMPAS to dedicate several exhibits to this history.

In 2020, Jordan purchased his late uncle Gene Wilder's house from Elon Musk and the property will be featured in the upcoming semi-autobiographical film The Requiem Boogie.

He is the co-founder of MoJo Global Arts which he left in June 2021 to become founder of the film production company HarlemHollywood.

Filmography

References

External links 

Jordan Walker-Pearlman's Official Site

American male screenwriters
Film producers from New York (state)
Film directors from New York City
1967 births
Living people
Screenwriters from New York (state)
American film producers